The O'Day 192 is an American trailerable sailboat that was designed by John Deknatel of C. Raymond Hunt Associates, as a pocket cruiser and first built in 1984.

The O'Day 192 replaced the O'Day 19 in the company's product line.

Production
The design was built by O'Day Corp., as part of Lear Siegler, in the United States between 1984 and 1997, but it is now out of production.

Design
The O'Day 192 is a recreational keelboat, built predominantly of fiberglass, with wood trim. It has a fractional sloop rig, a raked stem, a slightly reverse transom, a transom-hung rudder controlled by a tiller and a fixed stub keel with a retractable centerboard. It displaces  and carries  of lead ballast.

The boat is normally fitted with a small  outboard motor for docking and maneuvering.

The design has sleeping accommodation for four people, with a double "V"-berth in the bow cabin and two straight quarter berths in the main cabin. There is an ice box that can be stowed under the companionway ladder. The head is located in the bow cabin under the "V"-berth.

Operational history
In a 2010 review Steve Henkel wrote, "the O'Day 192 is a nicely finished update of the O'Day 19. With limited interior space (just room for a child-sized V-berth and two adult-sized quarter berths), the designers decided against including room for a galley, though they did find space for a chemical head beneath the V-berth and an ice chest in the companionway. The low quarter berths have 4' 0" sitting headroom, reduced to 3' 4" over the cushion atop the toilet. Best features: The finish and construction is very good, above and below decks. The comfortable, angled seating in the cockpit and the effective, no-slip non-skid in the cockpit and on deck are also big pluses. Schaefer roller furling is standard, which is a plus, but the jib is sheeted through fixed jib blocks, which limits control of the size and shape of the sail. Worst features: Sail controls are too few and too simple. The 3-to-1 mainsheet attached to the backstay is awkward to release in moderate or strong winds. We'd add a vang, rerig the mainsheet to a block on the cockpit sole, and install jibsheet tracks along the rail."

See also
List of sailing boat types

References

Keelboats
1980s sailboat type designs
Sailing yachts
Trailer sailers
Sailboat type designs by John Deknatel
Sailboat type designs by C. Raymond Hunt Associates
Sailboat types built by O'Day Corp.